

Infantry weapons

Commonwealth

Sidearms 

 Webley Revolver
 Enfield No. 2
Colt Model 1903 Pocket Hammerless:Used by high rank officer such as General Sir Gerald Templer
Browning Hi-Power
M1911 pistol
Smith & Wesson Model 10
Luger pistol
Nambu pistol

Rifles 

 Short Magazine Lee Enfield
 Lee-Enfield MkIII
Lee Enfield No. 4
Jungle Carbine
De Lisle carbine
Type 30 rifle
M1903 Springfield
Geweer M. 95
L1A1 Self-Loading Rifle

Shotgun 

 Browning Auto-5
Remington Model 11

Submachine Gun 

 Thompson submachine gun
 Sten
 Sterling submachine gun
M50 Reising
Owen gun
Madsen M-50
MP 18
M3 submachine gun
MP 40
Type 100 submachine gun

Machine Gun 

 Bren light machine gun
 Lewis gun
 Vickers machine gun
 MG 08
M1918 Browning Automatic Rifle
M1917 Browning machine gun

Grenade 
Mills bombs

Anti-Tank weapons 

 Boys anti-tank rifle

Communist Guerrillas

Sidearms 

 Webley Revolver
 Enfield No. 2
 Browning Hi-Power
 M1911 pistol:Used by Muhammad Indera during Bukit Kepong incident
 Mauser C96:Supplied by Soviet Union
 Luger pistol
 Walther P38
 TT pistol:Supplied by Soviet Union

Rifles 

 Lee – Metford
Lee-Enfield MkIII
Lee Enfield No. 4
Jungle Carbine
M1 and M1A1 carbine
AK 47
Type 38 rifle
Type 99 rifle
Type 44 carbine
Gewehr 1888 :Supplied by Soviet Union
Gewehr 98:Supplied by Soviet Union
Mosin–Nagant:Supplied by Soviet Union
M1903A3 Springfields
M95 Mannlicher Carbines

Shotgun 
Browning Auto-5
Remington Model 11
Harrington & Richardson Topper Shotgun

Submachine Gun 
Thompson submachine gun
Sten MK2 and MK 5
Sterling submachine gun
M50 Reising
PPSh-41
Type 100 submachine gun
Madsen M-50:Captured from The Commonwealth of Nations troops

Machine Gun 
Bren gun
Type 11 light machine gun
Type 92 heavy machine gun
Type 96 light machine gun
Type 99 light machine gun

Grenade Launcher 
Type 10 grenade discharger
Type 89 grenade discharger

Hand Grenade 

 Mills Bomb

References 

Weapons
Malayan Emergency
Malayan Emergency